The 2012 Western Illinois Leathernecks football team represented Western Illinois University as a member of the Missouri Valley Football Conference (MVFC) in the 2012 NCAA Division I FCS football season. They were led by head coach Mark Hendrickson in his fourth full season and fifth overall year since coaching the first seven games of the 2008 season. They played their home games at Hanson Field. Western Illinois finished the season 3–8 overall and 1–7 in MVFC play to place ninth.

Schedule

Source: Schedule

References

Western Illinois
Western Illinois Leathernecks football seasons
Western Illinois Leathernecks football